Jennifer Kotwal is an Indian actress and a model who predominantly appeared in Hindi, Kannada and Telugu language films. She is best known for her Kannada film Jogi.

In 2015, she was a travel host for a season of Oh My Gold which was telecast on the Travel and Living Channel.

Filmography

Kannada

Hindi

Telugu

Television

References

External links
 
 

 

Actresses from Mumbai
Living people
Parsi people from Mumbai
Actresses in Kannada cinema
Actresses in Hindi television
Indian television actresses
Indian film actresses
Actresses in Telugu cinema
21st-century Indian actresses
Actresses in Hindi cinema
20th-century Indian actresses
Year of birth missing (living people)